Nasser Al-Owaidan (born 21 April 1996) is a Saudi Arabian footballer who plays as a striker.

References

External links
 

Living people
1996 births
Association football forwards
Saudi Arabian footballers
Al-Shabab FC (Riyadh) players
Al-Sharq Club players
Al-Anwar Club players
Place of birth missing (living people)
Saudi Professional League players
Saudi Second Division players
Saudi Fourth Division players
Saudi Third Division players